Canton Center is an MBTA Commuter Rail station in Canton, Massachusetts. It serves the Providence/Stoughton Line, including most Stoughton Branch service except for evening inbound trains. The station has 1 side platform on the south side of the track west of Washington Street; the platform has a mini-high section for accessibility.

Plans

Around 2001, the station was briefly proposed to be closed as part of the South Coast Rail project.

The station is proposed to be reconstructed as part of Phase 2 of the since-modified project, which will extend the Stoughton Branch south to several South Coast cities in 2030. Under plans released in 2013, a second track would be added through the station to support increased bidirectional service; two full-length low-level platforms would be built, each with two mini-high platforms for accessibility. , full-length high-level platforms are planned.

See also
List of Old Colony Railroad stations

References

Further reading

External links

MBTA - Canton Center
 Station from Washington Street from Google Maps Street View

MBTA Commuter Rail stations in Norfolk County, Massachusetts
Former New York, New Haven and Hartford Railroad stations